Isabel of Viseu (1459–1521) was a daughter of Infante Fernando, Duke of Viseu and his wife and cousin Infanta Beatrice, Duchess of Viseu. She was a member of the House of Aviz and later, House of Braganza.

Family
She was the sister of Manuel I of Portugal and Leonor of Viseu. Her maternal grandparents were Infante João of Portugal and his wife Isabella of Barcelos. Her paternal grandparents were Edward of Portugal and Leonor of Aragon.

Isabel's cousin was Isabella I of Castile, wife of Ferdinand II of Aragon and mother of the English queen, Catherine of Aragon.

Life

Marriage
She married Fernando II, Duke of Braganza, a marriage that would later end in tragedy. This was Fernando's second marriage, after the death of his first wife, Leonor de Menezes. Leonor had not borne any children, so Isabel needed to deliver a son.

Isabel and Fernando had seven children:
 Filippe de Braganza (6 July 1475 - 1483)
 Jaime, Duke of Braganza (1479 - 20 September 1532), succeeded his father as Duke of Braganza. Married firstly to Eleanor of Mendoza, had issue. Married secondly to Joana de Mendoça and had issue.
 Dinis of Braganza, Count of Lemos (1481 - 9 May 1516), younger surviving son and ancestor of John IV of Portugal.
 Margarida de Braganza, died young in June 1483.

Downfall
Even at a young age, John II of Portugal was not popular among the peers of the kingdom since he was immune to external influence and appeared to despise intrigue. The nobles (including particularly Isabella's husband, the Duke of Braganza) were afraid of his future policies as king. Events proved them right.

After the official accession to the throne in 1481, John II took a series of measures to curtail the overgrown power of his aristocracy and to concentrate power on himself. Immediately, the nobles started to conspire; John II did nothing but observe. Letters of complaint and pleas to intervene were exchanged between the Duke of Braganza and Queen Isabella I of Castile. In 1483, this correspondence was intercepted by royal spies. The House of Braganza was outlawed, their lands confiscated and Isabel's husband executed in Évora.

The following year Isabel's brother was murdered by King John himself because there was word of a new conspiracy that also involved Isabel's second cousin and her father's brother in law. Isabel's family would have felt safe because her sister Leonor was married to John II, but they weren't safe at all. Many other members of Isabel's family were murdered including her elder brother Diogo, Duke of Viseu.

Later years
In 1495, John died without surviving legitimate issue and Isabel's brother succeeded him as Manuel I of Portugal. At first, Leanor was made heiress but because she was Dowager Queen and had no surviving children, the post as heiress was passed to Isabel, who in turn passed it to her eldest son Jaime, who was heir from 1495 until 1498 when Manuel's son Miguel da Paz, Prince of Portugal was born.
 
Isabel died in 1521, she was 62 years of age at the Lisbon Convent of the Mother of God, her brother died later in the year, her sister Leonor died 4 years later. Out of their four children Jaime and Dinis survived to adulthood, Jaime later succeeded his father as Duke of Braganza.

Ancestry

See also
 Duke of Braganza

References

1521 deaths
1459 births
House of Aviz
House of Braganza
Duchesses of Braganza
15th-century Portuguese people
16th-century Portuguese people
15th-century Portuguese women
16th-century Portuguese women